Savannah and Atlanta 750, formerly Florida East Coast 80, is a 4-6-2 “Light Pacific” steam locomotive built in January 1910 by the American Locomotive Company (ALCO) of Schenectady, New York, originally for the Florida East Coast Railway (FEC) as No. 80. Throughout the 1930s, FEC had sold of several of their locomotives, with No. 80 being sold in 1935 to the Savannah and Atlanta Railway, where it was renumbered to 750. The locomotive pulled commuter passenger trains and occasional mixed freight trains for the S&A, until the railroad dieselized in the early 1950s. In 1962, the locomotive was donated to the Atlanta Chapter of the National Railway Historical Society, who began using the locomotive to pull occasional excursion trains. No. 750 was subsequently leased to the Southern Railway for use to pull trains for their new steam excursion program, and the lease ended in 1984. From 1985 to 1989, the locomotive pulled excursion trains for the New Georgia Railroad around Atlanta, until it was retired, due to firebox issues. As of 2022, No. 750 remains on static display inside the Southeastern Railway Museum in Duluth, Georgia.

History

Revenue service on the FEC and S&A (1910–1962)

No. 750 was the fourteenth member of the Florida East Coast Railway's  (FEC) thirty-one class 65 4-6-2 "Pacific" type locomotives built by the American Locomotive Company's (ALCO) former Schenectady Locomotive Works in Schenectady, New York in January 1910, and No. 750 was originally numbered 80. The FEC assigned No. 80 to pull passenger trains on their mainline, mostly across their Overseas Railroad between Miami and Key West, Florida. In 1926, No. 80 was one of five class 65 4-6-2s to be modified with larger cylinders, superheated flues, and other features to make their performances more identical to the class 98 locomotives. In 1935, however, the Labor Day Hurricane destroyed many of the Overseas Railroad route's long bridges, and due to the Great Depression, the FEC closed the line down. In order to recoup their financial losses, the FEC sold of most of their 4-6-2s, and No. 80 was sold to the Savannah and Atlanta Railway (S&A) in October.

Upon arrival of the S&A, No. 80 was renumbered to 750, its firebox was converted from burning oil to burning coal, and was repainted to have a closer resemblance to a typical Southeastern American passenger locomotive. The S&A reassigned the No. 750 to haul passengers between Savannah and Camak in Georgia. It also often interchanged with the Central of Georgia Railway, so the passengers would reach Atlanta. This practice, however, slowly became less common for the No. 750, as the S&A added diesel locomotives to their fleet. In 1952, the 750 was retired from revenue service, altogether. After a subsequent period of storage, the S&A’s president, Charles E. Gay, authorized to donate No. 750 to the Atlanta chapter of the National Railway Historical Society (NRHS).

Excursion service (1964–1989)

In 1964, the No. 750 was restored to operating condition, and it became the very first steam locomotive to pull a public excursion train for the Southern Railway’s brand new steam excursion program, as it pulled one such trip for the Atlanta Chapter NRHS. Within the following years, the Southern would keep the No. 750 on loan to pull a variety of excursion trains on the Southern’s mainline trackage alongside the Southern steam locomotives Numbers 4501, 722, and 630. In November 1969, during the 75th anniversary of the Southern Railway, an event called the "Steam-O-Rama" took place in Anniston, Alabama, along the Birmingham to Atlanta main line. It featured the No. 750, No. 4501, and visiting British locomotive London and North Eastern Railway A3 No. 4472 Flying Scotsman. As time dragged on, however, the steam program had grown so popular, that the trains have exceeded the No. 750’s hauling capacity. Hence, why the locomotive would receive assistance from diesels, and it would take parts in some doubleheaders with 722. In 1975, the No. 750 was taken out of service for an extensive overhaul. In 1983, it went back into service and double-headed an NRHS excursion with Norfolk and Western 611 on Richmond, Fredericksburg and Potomac (RF&P) trackage from Alexandria to Richmond, Virginia, on July 17.

After the 1984 season ended, the Southern's lease to operate No. 750 ended, and the locomotive was returned to Atlanta. The locomotive was then leased to the New Georgia Railroad to pull mainline trips throughout certain parts of Georgia. In 1989, however, No. 750's firebox was discovered to have been worn out, and after estimating the repair costs to be too expensive, it was decided to remove No. 750 from service, and the New Georgia Railroad subsequently replaced it with a larger locomotive, Atlanta and West Point 290.

Disposition (1989–present) 
As of 2022, the No. 750 remains on static display inside the Southeastern Railroad Museum in Duluth, Georgia. Since the rebuilding the locomotive would be too costly, No. 750 is unlikely to be brought back under steam anytime soon. Despite this, the museum has been keeping No. 750 in good cosmetic condition, so it would still be presentable to the general public.

See also
 Atlantic Coast Line 1504
 Canadian Pacific 1238
 Canadian Pacific 1278
 Canadian Pacific 1293
 Florida East Coast 153
 Pennsylvania Railroad 1361
 Reading and Northern 425
 Southern Pacific 2472
 Southern Pacific 2467
 Southern Railway 1401
 U.S. Sugar 148

References

Bibliography

Further reading

External links

 Southeastern Railway Museum Locomotives

4-6-2 locomotives
ALCO locomotives
Florida East Coast Railway
Preserved steam locomotives of Georgia
Railway locomotives introduced in 1910
Standard gauge locomotives of the United States
Steam locomotives of the United States